Acria nivalis is a moth in the family Depressariidae. It was described by Wang and Li in 2000. It is found in China (Henan).

The wingspan is 18–21 mm.

References

Moths described in 2000
Acria